Von Munthe af Morgenstierne is a Danish and a Norwegian noble family living in Norway. It descends from Bredo Munthe of  Bekkeskov, who on 19 December 1755 was ennobled under the name von Munthe af Morgenstierne. The family is included in the Yearbook of the Danish Nobility.

Name
The noble name von Munthe af Morgenstierne was derived from the surnames of two families, Munthe and Morgenstierne, from which Bredo Munthe had descended. When he applied for ennoblement, he claimed that these two families were originally noble.

Origin
Supreme Court Judge Bredo Munthe (1701–1757) was the son of  Otto Christophersen Munthe (1659–1733), parish priest at Fron  in Gudbrandsdalen and great-grandson of Ludvig Hansen Munthe (1593–1649), Bishop of the Diocese of Bergen. Patrilineality he descended from bailiff Christopher Giertssøn Morgenstierne (1619–79) who married Birgitta Ludvigsdatter Munthe (1634–1708). Their seven children took the surname Munthe.

Coat of arms
The arms, which were granted upon the ennoblement, are partly based on Munthe's old arms.

Description: On a shield divided into two fields, whereof the upper is silver and the lower is red, in the 1st field two chopped and crossed brown tree stems under a ten-pointed golden star, and in the 2nd field three silver balls. On the helm a noble coronet and up from this two bear paws holding three silver balls. Supporters: two against each other sitting and onto the shield looking brown bears.

Members

 Bredo von Munthe af Morgenstierne
 Otto Christopher von Munthe af Morgenstierne
 Christian Fredrik Jacob von Munthe af Morgenstierne
 Vilhelm Ludvig Herman von Munthe af Morgenstierne
 Bredo Henrik von Munthe af Morgenstierne, Sr.
 Bredo Henrik von Munthe af Morgenstierne
 Christian von Munthe af Morgenstierne
 Otto Christofer von Munthe af Morgenstierne
 Wilhelm Thorleif von Munthe af Morgenstierne
 Georg Valentin von Munthe af Morgenstierne
 Otto von Munthe af Morgenstierne

See also
 Norwegian nobility
 Munthe
 Christopher Morgenstierne Munthe

References

Literature and sources
 Hans Krag (1955): Norsk heraldisk mønstring fra Fredrik IVss regjeringstid 1699–1730
 Hans Cappelen (1969): Norske slektsvåpen
 Herman Leopoldus Løvenskiold (1978): Heraldisk nøkkel
 Harald Nissen & Monica Aase (1990): Segl i Universitetsbiblioteket i Trondheim

External links

Norwegian noble families